Sergey Vasilyevich Aydarov (born Vishnevsky, Вишневский, 20 October 1867 — 16 August 1938) was a Russian and Soviet stage actor and theatre director, associated with the Moscow's Maly Theatre where he made his debut in 1898. 

Aydarov was born in Moscow, then in Imperial Russia. His most acclaimed parts were those in the plays by Alexander Ostrovsky (Krutitsky in Enough Stupidity in Every Wise Man, Vyshnevsky in A Profitable Position, Berendey in The Snow Maiden, Ivan Grozny in Vasilisa Melentyeva, Dulebov in Talents and Admirers), as well in Julius Caesar and The Tempest by William Shakespeare.

As a theatre director, Aydarov produced several plays, including Pyotr Gnedich's Before the Dawn (1901), as well as Ostrovsky's Vasilisa Melentyeva (1914) and A Busy Place (1915). In 1925—1930 he was the head of the Maly Theatre Yermolova Studio, later to be reformed into the Yermolova Theatre. He died in Moscow.

References 

Russian stage actors
Russian theatre directors
Male actors from Moscow
1867 births
1938 deaths
Theatre people from Moscow